The Last Supper (Portuguese: Última Ceia ou Instituição da Sagrada Eucaristia) is an altarpiece by Grão Vasco Fernandes, from 1535.

Description 
The painting is an oil on canvas with overall dimensions of 151 x 201.5 centimeters. It is in the collection of the Grão Vasco Museum, in Viseu.

Analysis 
The triptych from the chapel of Santa Marta, of the ancient Archbishop's Palace at Fontelo, shows the Last Supper, with Judas leaving on the left panel.

Sources

References 

1535 paintings
Portuguese art
Altarpieces
Fernandes
Dogs in art